Âu Lạc (Hán tự: 甌貉/甌駱; pinyin: Ōu Luò; Wade–Giles: Wu1-lo4 Middle Chinese (ZS): *ʔəu-*lɑk̚ < Old Chinese *ʔô-râk) was a supposed polity that covered parts of modern-day Guangxi and northern Vietnam. Founded in 257 BCE by a figure called Thục Phán (King An Dương), it was a merger of Nam Cương (Âu Việt) and Văn Lang (Lạc Việt) but succumbed to the state of Nanyue in 179 BCE, which, itself was finally conquered by the Han dynasty. Its capital was in Cổ Loa, present-day Hanoi, in the Red River Delta.

History

Foundation

 
According to folklore, prior to Chinese domination of northern and north-central Vietnam, the region was ruled by a series of kingdoms called Văn Lang with a hierarchical government, headed by Lạc Kings (Hùng Kings), who were served by Lạc hầu and Lạc tướng. In approximately 257 BCE, Văn Lang was purportedly annexed by the Âu Việt state of Nam Cương. These Âu Việt people inhabited the southern part of the Zuo River, the drainage basin of You River and the upstream areas of the Lô, Gâm, and Cầu Rivers, according to Vietnamese historian Đào Duy Anh. The leader of the Âu Việt, Thục Phán, overthrew the last Hùng kings, and unified the two kingdoms, establishing the Âu Lạc polity and proclaiming himself King An Dương (An Dương Vương). According to Taylor (1983):

Construction of Cổ Loa Citadel

 

 
Cổ Loa, the largest prehistoric moated urban settlement in Southeast Asia, was the first political hub of Vietnamese civilization in the pre-Sinitic era, encompassing , and requiring as many as 2 million cubic meters of material. The construction might have begun as early as the fourth century BCE, while the middle phase of construction was between 300 and 100 BCE. The scale of Cổ Loa's rampart system, along with the complex forms of labor organization and labor expenses needed for its construction, demonstrated the polity's ability to produce enough surplus, mobilize resources, direct and ensure continued construction, as well as upkeep the citadel over time. This signaled a high degree of political centralization and a durable political authority that was highly "consolidated, institutionalized, and concentrated". Kim (2015) estimated that building such a large-scale project required between 3,171,300 and 5,285,500 person-days. It can provide "physical, symbolic, and psychological protection", showing off the polity's power and self-defense ability, thus deterring any potential threat.
 
Historical accounts claim, after purportedly taking power, Kinh An Dương ordered to construct a fortified settlement called Cổ Loa as his seat of power. It looked like a snail shell (its name, Cổ Loa 古螺, means "old snail": according to Đại Việt Sử Ký Toàn Thư, the citadel is shaped like a snail).
 
The events related to the construction of Cổ Loa are remembered in the legend of the golden turtle. According to this legend, when being built, the citadel saw all the work mysteriously undone by a group of spirits led by a thousand-year-old white chicken seeking to avenge the son of the previous King. In response to the King's plea, a giant golden turtle suddenly emerged from the water and protected the King until the citadel's completion. The turtle gave the King one of his claws before leaving and instructed him to make a crossbow using it as a trigger, assuring him he would be invincible with it. A man called Cao Lỗ (or Cao Thông) was tasked with creating that crossbow. It was then called "Saintly Crossbow of the Supernaturally Luminous Golden Claw" (靈光金爪神弩; SV: Linh Quang Kim Trảo Thần Nỏ); one shot could kill 300 men.

Collapse

In 204 BCE, in Panyu (now Guangzhou), Zhao Tuo established the kingdom of Nanyue. Taylor (1983) believed that when Nanyue and Âu Lạc co-existed, Âu Lạc temporarily acknowledged Nanyue to show their mutual anti-Han sentiment, and this did not imply that Nanyue exerted any real authority over Âu Lạc. Nanyue's influence over Âu Lạc waned after it normalized relations with the Han dynasty. The army Zhao Tuo had created to oppose the Han was now available to deploy against the Âu Lạc.
 
The details of the campaign were not authentically recorded. Zhao Tuo's early setbacks and eventual victory against King An Dương were mentioned in Records of the Outer Territory of Jiao Region (交州外域記) and Records of the Taikang Era of the Jin (晉太康記).  Records of the Grand Historian mentioned neither King An Duong nor Zhao Tuo's military conquest of Âu Lạc only that after Empress Lü's death (180 BCE), Zhao Tuo used his troops to menace and his wealth to bribe the Minyue, the Western Ou, and the Luo into submission. However, the campaign inspired a legend about the transfer of the crossbow. According to the myth, ownership of the crossbow conferred political power: "He who is able to hold this crossbow rules the realm; he who is not able to hold this crossbow will perish."
 
Unsuccessful on the battlefield, Zhao Tuo asked for a truce and sent his son Zhong Shi to King An Dương's court. Zhong Shi and Mỵ Châu, King An Duong's daughter, fell in love and were married. Matrilocal society required the husband to live in his wife's residence, so the couple stayed at An Duong's court. Meanwhile, King An Duong mistreated Cao Lỗ, and he left.
 
Zhong Shi had Mỵ Châu showed him the crossbow, at which point he secretly changed its trigger, rendering it useless. He then asked to return to his father, who thereupon launched a fresh attack on Âu Lạc and this time defeated King An Dương. The turtle then told the King about his daughter's betrayal and killed his daughter for her treachery before going into the watery realm. It is possible that the magical crossbow may have been a type of new model army under Cao Thông's command that was influenced by the technologies and innovations from the Warring States.
 
Zhao Tuo then incorporated the regions into Nanyue but left the indigenous chiefs controlling the population. This was the first time the region formed part of a polity headed by a Chinese ruler. Zhao Tuo sent two officials to supervise the Âu Lạc lords, one in the Red River Delta, named Giao Chỉ, and one in the Mã and Cả River, named Cửu Chân. Their chief interest seemed to be trade; and their influence was limited outside one or two outposts. Local society remained unchanged.
 
In 111 BCE, the Han dynasty conquered Nanyue and ruled it for the next several hundred years. Just as under Nanyue, power was in the hands of local lords. "Seals and ribbons" were bestowed upon these local leaders as their status symbol, in return, they paid "tribute to a suzerain" but the Han officials considered this as "taxes". Indigenous ways of life and ruling class did not experience significant Sinitic impact into the first century C.E. It was not until the fourth decade of the first century C.E. that the Han imposed more direct rule and stepped up efforts at Sinicization. The Han fully consolidated their control, replacing the loose tribute system by a full Han administration and ruling the region directly as provinces. Before that, while "some form of nominal northern hegemony was installed", there was no evidence that any Chinese-style enterprise controlled the region during the second or first centuries BCE as certain historical accounts are relatively Sinocentric and misleading as to the nature of Proto-Vietnamese society before the "real, later imposition of full Chinese power".

Government and society
Based on evidence from the historical, ethnohistorical, and archaeological records, Kim (2015) believed that a "highly centralized, overarching state-level society with enduring political institutions and structure" between 300 and 100 BCE was responsible for the construction of the Cổ Loa settlement. Its size and the requisite workforce to construct it implied "a strong military force and significant centralized, state-like control". The number of bronze tools also suggested the existence of centralized production, social stratification, and material monopolization. That roof tiles can only be found at Cổ Loa also indicated that the site was the capital. Surrounding villages and communities seem to have paid taxes to the centralized polity.

Ancient Han Chinese had described the people of Âu Lạc as barbaric in need of civilizing, regarding them as lacking morals and modesty. Chinese chronicles maintain the native people in the Red River Delta were deficient in knowledge of agriculture, metallurgy, politics, and their civilization was a by-product of Chinese colonization. They denied in situ cultural evolution or social complexity, attributing any development to Sinicization, though they were aware of this "stable, structured, productive, populous, and relatively sophisticated" society they encountered.

Women enjoyed high status in Lạc society. Such a society is a matrilocal society, a societal system in which a married couple resides with or near the wife's parents. Thus, the female offspring of a mother remain living in (or near) the mother's house, forming large clan-families couples after marriage would often go to live with the wife's family. It has also been said that Proto-Vietnamese society was matrilineal. The status of Lạc lords transferred through the mother's lineage while women had inheritance rights. In addition, they also practiced levirate, meaning widows had a right to marry a male relative of her late husband, often his brother, to obtain heirs. This practice provided an heir for the mother, protecting widows' interests and reflecting female authority, although some patriarchal societies used it to keep wealth within the male family bloodline.

Demographics

There was a high population level in the region prior to the arrival of the Han dynasty. It is estimated that the population for Cổ Loa and the environs was thousands of people, and for the greater delta region the population was tens of thousands of people, if not hundreds of thousands. This is supported by the census of A.D. 2, according to which three prefectures of Giao Chỉ, Cửu Chân and Nhật Nam contained 981,755 people. Although some can be attributable to immigration from the north, Han immigration into northern Vietnam was not overwhelming during this time, and population levels were not affected until after the middle of the second century.

Later Chinese officials called the local people Lạc (Lou) and Âu (Ou). The Lac people are generally believed to be Austroasiatic speakers. Taylor (2013) believed the lowland population mostly spoke Proto-Viet-Muong while those from the mountainous areas north and west of the Red River Delta spoke an ancient language similar to modern Khmu. French linguist Michel Ferlus in 2009 concludes that the Vietnamese are the "most direct heirs" of Đông Sơn culture (c. 7th BC to 1st AD), which was "precisely located in the North of Vietnam". Specifically, Ferlus (2009) showed that the inventions of pestle, oar and a pan to cook sticky rice, which is the main characteristic of the Đông Sơn culture, correspond to the creation of new lexicons for these inventions in Northern Vietic (Việt–Mường) and Central Vietic (Cuoi-Toum). The new vocabularies of these inventions were proven to be derivatives from original verbs rather than borrowed lexical items. On the other hand, the Âu possibly spoke a language related to the Tai-Kadai language family. Archaeological evidence reveals that during the pre-Dongson period, the Red River Delta was prominently Austroasiatic, such as genetic samples from the Mán Bạc burial site (dated 1,800 BCE) have close proximity to modern Austroasiatic speakers, and then during the Dongson period, genetic examples yield to a significant proportion of Tai stocks (known as Au, Li-Lao) possibly living along with Vietic speakers.

Economy

The economy was characterized by agriculture with wet rice cultivation, draft animals, metal plowshares, axes and other tools, as well as irrigation complexes. The cultivation of irrigated rice may have started in the beginning of the second millennium BCE, evidenced by findings from palynological sequences, while metal tools were regularly used before any significant Sino-Vietic interaction. Chapuis (1995) also suggested the existence of line fishing and some specialization and division of labor.

Northern Vietnam was also a major hub of interregional access and exchange, connected to other area through an extensive extraregional trade network, since well before the first millennium BC, thanks to its strategic location, access to key interaction routes and resources, including proximity to major rivers or the coast and a high distribution of copper, tin, and lead ores. Kim (2015) believed its economic and commercial value, including its location and access to key waterways and exotic tropical goods, would have been main reasons the Chinese conquered the region, giving them unrestricted access to other parts of Southeast Asia.

See also

 Đông Sơn culture
 History of Vietnam
 Hồng Bàng dynasty
 Lạc Việt
 Âu Việt
 Nam Việt
 Triệu dynasty
 Zhao Tuo
 Panyu District
 Trọng Thủy
 An Dương Vương
 Cổ Loa Citadel
 Tây Vu Vương
 Baiyue

Notes

Citations

Early

Modern

Bibliography

Early

Modern

External links

 Âu Lạc on Encyclopædia Britannica

States and territories established in the 3rd century BC
States and territories disestablished in the 2nd century BC
179 BC
1st-millennium BC disestablishments in Vietnam
257 BC
250s BC establishments
3rd-century BC disestablishments
3rd-century BC establishments in Vietnam
Ancient Vietnam
Former countries in Vietnamese history
Former countries in Chinese history
Nanyue
Former monarchies of Asia
History of Guangxi
Hong River Delta
Iron Age Asia
Former countries in Southeast Asia
History of Vietnam